Royal Australian College  may refer to:

 Royal Australian Air Force College
 Royal Australian College of Dental Surgeons
 Royal Australian College of General Practitioners

See also

 
 
 Royal Australian and New Zealand College (disambiguation)
 Royal College (disambiguation)